Events from the year 1913 in art.

Events

 January 16 (OS) – Ilya Repin's painting Ivan the Terrible and His Son Ivan in the Tretyakov Gallery, Moscow, is slashed.
 January 19 – Lovis Corinth's retrospective opens at the Munich Secession galleries. This year the "New Munich Secession" splits from the Munich Secession.
 End of January – Franz Marc's Collection II opens at the Moderne Galerie Heinrich Thannhauser in Munich. This is followed at the gallery in February by the first major retrospective of Picasso's work.
 February–March – English painter Olive Hockin is implicated in suffragette attacks.

 February 17 – The Armory Show opens in New York City. It displays works of artists who are to become some of the most influential painters of the early 20th century.
 March 10 – French sculptor Camille Claudel is committed by her family to a psychiatric hospital where she will remain until her death in 1943.
 April – Marcel Duchamp withdraws from painting and begins working as a library assistant in the Sainte-Geneviève Library in Paris to be able to earn a living wage while concentrating on scholarship and working on his The Bride Stripped Bare by Her Bachelors, Even.
 May – The Paul Émile Chabas painting September Morn provokes a charge of indency when displayed in the window of a Chicago art gallery.
 May 27 – Die Brücke dissolved.
 May 29 – The ballet The Rite of Spring, with music by Igor Stravinsky conducted by Pierre Monteux, choreography by Vaslav Nijinsky and design by Nicholas Roerich, is premièred by Sergei Diaghilev's Ballets Russes at the Théâtre des Champs-Élysées in Paris, its modernism provoking one of the most famous classical music riots in history. The audience includes Gabriele D'Annunzio, Coco Chanel, Marcel Duchamp, Harry Graf Kessler and Maurice Ravel.
 August–September – Ernst Ludwig Kirchner spends the summer painting on the island of Fehmarn; returning to Berlin he begins his series of street scenes from around the Potsdamer Platz.
 September 19 – First German Autumn Salon opens in Berlin, featuring 366 paintings by 90 artists from 12 countries, notably Franz Marc; Guillaume Apollinaire and Filippo Tommaso Marinetti deliver accompanying lectures.
 Autumn – The Neue Galerie in Berlin reopens with displays of the work of Picasso and others associated with French Modernism.
 October – August Macke paints at Hilterfingen.
 October 18 – Monument to the Battle of the Nations at Leipzig, designed by Bruno Schmitz incorporating sculptures by Christian Behrens and Franz Metzner, is inaugurated.
 December 12 – Leonardo da Vinci's Mona Lisa, stolen from the Louvre in 1911, is located in Florence when Vincenzo Peruggia attempts to sell it. It is returned to Paris on December 30.
 Generación del 13 established in Chile.
 The London Group is formed by merger of the Camden Town Group and the Vorticists; it will hold its first exhibition in March 1914.
 Target, the first exhibition of Rayonism.
 Maurice Utrillo has his first solo exhibition, at the Galerie Blot in Paris, but attracts little notice at this time.
 Omega Workshops established in London by Roger Fry and other members of the Bloomsbury Group to produce artist-designed furniture and textiles. Wyndham Lewis and others secede in October.
 First observation of a chimpanzee drawing.
 English connoisseur Hugh Blaker discovers and acquires the "Isleworth Mona Lisa".
 Guillaume Apollinaire's The Cubist Painters, Aesthetic Meditations (Les Peintres Cubistes, Méditations Esthétiques) is published in Paris.

Works

Graphic works
 Anna Ancher – Fru Ane Brøndum i den blå stue (Portrait of the Artist's Mother)
 Max Beckmann – Sinking of the Titanic
 Vanessa Bell
 Design for Overmantel Mural
 Street Corner Conversation
 Summer Camp
 George Bellows
 Cliff Dwellers
 Evening Blue
 Umberto Boccioni
 Dynamism of a Cyclist
 Dynamism of a Man's Head
 Dynamism of a Soccer Player
 Marc Chagall – Self-Portrait with Seven Fingers
 Salvador Dalí (aged about 9) – Vilabertran
 Giorgio de Chirico
 The Anxious Journey (Museum of Modern Art, New York)
 Le Rêve Transformé (Saint Louis Art Museum)
 Roger de La Fresnaye 
La Vie Conjugale (Married Life)
The Conquest of the Air (La conquête de l'air; Museum of Modern Art, New York)
 Robert Delaunay – Simultaneous Contrasts: Sun and Moon
 André Derain – Portrait of a Girl in Black
 Pavel Filonov – The Banquet of Kings
 Henri Gaudier-Brzeska – Self-portrait
 Albert Gleizes
 Portrait de l’éditeur Eugène Figuière
 Man in a Hammock
 J. W. Godward
 The Belvedere
 Le Billet Doux
 Golden Hours
 In the Tepidarium
 La Pensierosa
 Erich Heckel – To the Convalescent Woman (triptych)
 Albert Herter – The Pageant of Nations (for St. Francis Hotel, San Francisco)
 James Dickson Innes – Arenig, North Wales
 Ludvig Karsten – The Blue Kitchen
 Ernst Ludwig Kirchner
 Berlin Street Scene
 Street, Berlin
 Laura Knight – Self Portrait with Nude
 Oskar Kokoschka – Double Portrait of Oskar Kokoschka and Alma Mahler
 František Kupka – The Cathedral (Katedrála)
 Fernand Léger – Contrasting Forms
 L. S. Lowry – House in Eccles Old Road
 August Macke
 Lady in a Green Jacket
 People at the Blue Lake (Leute am blauen See)
 Promenade
 Sunlight Walk (Sonniger Weg)
 Tightrope walker (Seiltänzerin)
 Two Girls
 Kazimir Malevich
 Bureau and Room
 Cow and Fiddle
 Head of a Peasant Girl (1912–13)
 The Knife Grinder (Principle of Glittering) (1912–13)
 Portrait of Matiushin
 Franz Marc
 The Bewitched Mill
 Birth of the Wolves (woodcut)
 Deer in the Forest I
 The Fate of the Animals (Tierschicksale)
 Foxes
 The Tower of Blue Horses (missing since 1945)
 The Wolves (Balkan War)
 Henri Matisse – Open Window, Tangier
 Ludwig Meidner – The City and I (Ich und die Stadt)
 Sidney Meteyard – "I Am Half-Sick of Shadows", Said the Lady of Shalott
 Jean Metzinger
 En Canot (Im Boot)
 La Femme à l'éventail (Woman with a fan)
 L'Oiseau bleu (The Blue Bird) 1912-1913
 Christopher R. W. Nevinson – The Arrival
 Franz Nölken – Max Reger
 Pablo Picasso – Guitar (Musée Picasso, Paris)
 Iso Rae – Rogation Sunday
 John Singer Sargent – Henry James
 Egon Schiele – Dämmernde Stadt
 Charles Sims – The Wood beyond the World
 Vardges Sureniants – Ferdowsi reading Shahnameh to Shah Mahmud Ghaznavi
 Albert Chevallier Tayler – The Quiet Hour

Sculptures

 Karl Bitter – Carl Schurz Monument, New York City
 Umberto Boccioni
 Development of a Bottle in Space
 Unique Forms of Continuity in Space
 Joseph Csaky – Figure de Femme Debout (Figure Habillée)
 Marcel Duchamp – Bicycle Wheel (readymade)
 Jacob Epstein – The Rock Drill (original form)
 Four Southern Poets Monument, Augusta, Georgia
 James Earle Fraser – Buffalo nickel (United States coinage)
 Carl Jacobsen – The Little Mermaid
 Wilhelm Lehmbruck
 Emporsteigender Jüngling
 Große Sinnende
 Pietro Porcelli – The Explorers' Monument, Fremantle, Western Australia
 Lorado Taft – Fountain of the Great Lakes
 Albert Toft – King Edward VII Memorial, Birmingham
 Elsa von Freytag-Loringhoven – Enduring Ornament (found object)
 Mahonri Young – Seagull Monument, Salt Lake City

Births
 January 29 – Reuben Kadish, American artist and educator (died 1992)
 January 30 – Amrita Sher-Gil, Hungarian-Indian painter (died 1941)
 February 15 – William Scott, Ulster Scots painter (died 1989)
 March 8 – Peter Wilson, English art auctioneer (died 1984)
 March 12 – Max Leognany, French artist (died 1994)
 March 19 – Mary Henry, American painter (died 2009)
 March 23 – Abidin Dino, Turkish artist (died 1993)
 March 29 – Hyman Bloom, Latvian American painter (died 2009)
 April 21 – Norman Parkinson, English fashion photographer (died 1990)
 May 6 – Marianne Appel, American mural painter and puppet designer (died 1988)
 May 7 - Mary Spencer Watson, English sculptor (died 2006)
 May 27 – Wols, born Alfred Otto Wolfgang Schulze, German-born painter and draughtsman (died 1951)
 July 12 – Roger Testu, French cartoonist (died 2008)
 July 22 – Robert C. Turner, American potter (died 2005)
 July 27 – Philip Guston, Canadian-born American Abstract Expressionist painter and printmaker (died 1980)
 September 1 – Ludwig Merwart, Austrian painter and graphic artist (died 1979)
 September 25 – Tony O'Malley, Irish painter (died 2003)
 September 28 – Warja Honegger-Lavater, Swiss artist and illustrator (died 2007)
 October 22 – Robert Capa, born Endre Friedmann, Hungarian-born war photographer (died 1954)
 November 21 – Tomie Ohtake, Japanese-Brazilian artist (died 2015)
 December 13 – Vladimir Tretchikoff, Russian artist (died 2006)
 December 24 – Ad Reinhardt, American painter and writer (died 1967)
 Full date unknown
 Russell Brockbank, Canadian-born cartoonist (died 1979)
 Mercedes Matter, born Mercedes Carles, American painter (died 2001)

Deaths
 January 6 – Gyula Juhász, Hungarian sculptor and engraver (born 1876)
 March 8 – Louis Saint-Gaudens, American sculptor (born 1854)
 March 13 – Félix Resurrección Hidalgo, Filipino painter (born 1855)
 April 20 – Vilhelm Bissen, Danish sculptor (born 1836)
 May 10 – Andreas Aubert, Norwegian art historian (born 1851)
 June 23 - Marc-Louis Solon, French-born ceramic artist (born 1835)
 July 10 – Mikoláš Aleš, Czech painter (born 1852)
 August 2 - George Hitchcock, American painter (born 1850)
 August 7 – Fernand Pelez, French painter (born 1843)
 September 28 – Sir Alfred East, English painter (born 1844)
 October 5 – Hans von Bartels, German painter (born 1856)
 Full date unknown – Caroline Shawk Brooks, American sculptor (born 1840)

References

 
Years of the 20th century in art
1910s in art